Yam Yam is an album by the Mark Turner Quintet released by Criss Cross Jazz in 1995. It was Turner's debut recording as a leader. It was re-issued as a double LP in 2022.

Track listing 
All compositions by Mark Turner except as indicated.
 "Tune Number One" – 9:00
 "Cubism" (Kurt Rosenwinkel) – 7:16 
 "Yam Yam I" – 10:47
 "Moment's Notice" (John Coltrane) – 6:10
 "Isolation" – 7:07 
 "Subtle Tragedy" (Brad Mehldau) – 9:59
 "Zürich" – 7:49
 "Blues" – 5:58
 "Yam Yam II" – 7:20

Personnel 
 Mark Turner – tenor saxophone
 Brad Mehldau – piano
 Kurt Rosenwinkel – guitar
 Larry Grenadier – double bass
 Jorge Rossy – drums

References 

Criss Cross Jazz albums
1995 debut albums
Instrumental albums
Mark Turner (musician) albums